Dauvergne is a surname. Notable people with the surname include:

Antoine Dauvergne (1713–1797), French composer and violinist
Catherine Dauvergne (born 1964), Canadian legal scholar
Geoffroy Dauvergne (1922–1977), French painter
Peter Dauvergne, Canadian political scientist